Shiwan could refer to:

Places 
Shíwān (石湾) could refer to the following locations in China:

 Shiwan Subdistrict, Huazhou, Guangdong
 Shiwanzhen Subdistrict (石湾镇街道), or Shiwan Town, Foshan, Guangdong

 Shiwan, Boluo County, Guangdong
 Shiwan, Hepu County, in Hepu County, Guangxi
 Shiwan, Hengdong (石湾镇), a town of Hengdong County, Hunan.
 Shiwan, Hengshan County, Shaanxi, in Hengshan County, Shaanxi

People 
 Shabnam Shiwan, Fijian designer based in New Zealand